Tommy Burns (1894-1987) was an Australian rugby league footballer who played in the 1920s.

Playing career
Burns is remembered as the first halfback at St. George in their first season, 1921. He went on to play 76 grade games for St George, 53 of them in first grade.

Burns had an impressive record at Rugby League starting at the Moore Park (Paddington) junions in 1909 and won three premierships with the club 1909–1911. After serving with the AIF during World War One he returned to league, captaining the Eastern Suburbs President Cup team in 1919.  Burns was graded at Easts for 1920 and played first grade with them during the season, then moved to the brand new St George club for their opening year in 1921. Burns retired at the end of the 1926 season after a great career.

War Service

Burns also fought in the Australian Army during WW1 in the 18th Battalion, C Company.

Death
Burns passed away at Peakhurst, New South Wales on 1 November 1987 at age 93 although he lived most of his life at Arncliffe, New South Wales

References

Sydney Roosters players
St. George Dragons players
Rugby league halfbacks
Australian rugby league players
Australian military personnel of World War I
1894 births
1987 deaths